Southern California Fusion were an American soccer team, founded in 2006, which competed in the National Premier Soccer League (NPSL), the fourth tier of the American Soccer Pyramid until 2007 when, despite being the reigning NPSL champions, the franchise chose to leave the league.

In 2007, the team played their home matches at Aviara Park in the city of Carlsbad, California, 35 miles north of downtown San Diego. The team's colors were black, red, white and gold. 

The team also fielded an indoor team from 2004 to 2011 in the Premier Arena Soccer League.

Year-by-year

Honors
 NPSL Champions 2007
 NPSL Southwest Division Champions 2007

External links
 Fusion Official Website
 Fusion Official Fan Page
 NPSL Official Website

National Premier Soccer League teams
Defunct soccer clubs in California
Soccer clubs in the Greater San Diego Area
Carlsbad, California
Defunct indoor soccer clubs in the United States
2004 establishments in California
Association football clubs established in 2004
2011 disestablishments in California
Association football clubs disestablished in 2011